The Ministry of Justice of the Republic of Lithuania was established in 1918. Its departments include European Law, prisons, state-guaranteed legal aid services in several major Lithuania cities, a patent bureau, consumer rights protection, the Law Institute, the Metrology Inspectorate, state enterprise and legal information centers, and forensic science.

Ministers

See also

 Justice ministry
 Lietuvos Respublikos teisingumo ministerija (Ministry of Justice of the Republic of Lithuania)
 Politics of Lithuania

References

 Ministry of Justice of the Republic of Lithuania 
 Institutions Controlled by the Ministry of Justice. Ministry of Justice of the Republic of Lithuania 

 
Lithuania
Justice
Lithuania, Justice